Niall Ó Glacáin, or Nellanus Glacanus (c. 1563–1653) was an Irish physician who worked to treat victims of bubonic plague outbreaks in various places throughout Europe.

Early life and education

Ó Glacáin's date of birth is uncertain. Some historians believe him to be about ninety upon his death in 1653, giving a birth date of around 1563. Giorgio Scharpes of the Faculty of Medicine, Bologna from 1634 to 1637, believed him to be about 48 during one of those years, giving a birth year of c. 1575.

He was born in Tír Chonaill, and may have received his early medical education from a local hereditary family of physicians such as the Mac Duinnshléibhe family of Tír Chonaill. At the time, such families were the only source of medical training in Ireland.

Physician work

Ó Glacáin made his way to Spain sometime before 1600, possibly in time to treat victims of an outbreak of the bubonic plague which was rampant from 1595 to 1602. He was at the Spanish court when Aodh Ruadh Ó Domhnaill arrived in Spain, and may have attended him upon his death in 1602. Ó Glacáin subsequently spent many years practicing medicine in Salamanca. In 1622, he moved to Valencia, residing there for two years. In 1627 he moved to France during an outbreak of the plague, working as a plague doctor in towns such as Fons, Figeac, Capdenac, Cajarc, Rovergue and Floyeac.

He had settled in Toulouse in time to treat victims of the outbreak of 1628. MacCuinneagáin states that Ó Glacáin "gained high esteem and general consideration because of the devotion which he showed in braving the contagion to succor the sick. He was appointed physician at the xenodochium pestiferorum, the plague hospital at Toulouse in 1628 and was appointed to the University there with the title Premier Professor of Medicine. He spent some time in Paris as physician to King Louis XIII and was also a Privy Councillor there."

By now a respected authority on plague treatment, he published his most famous work, Tractatus de Peste, at Toulouse in 1629. It contained his concise descriptions of the plague, its various effects on different patients such as buboes, rashes, headaches, vomiting and coma. Suggested treatments including bleeding, the use of clysters, purgatives, and fumigation.

An especially interesting part of the text is a description of four post-mortems which he carried out, where he noted the occurrence of petechial haemorrhages which "covered the surface of the victims' lungs and also the swelling of the spleen."

Ó Glacáin was a pioneer in pathological anatomy, with his work predating that of Giovanni Battista Morgagni (1682–1771) by several decades.

Time in Italy

Ó Glacáin moved to Italy in the early 1630s, where his services were sought by The Faculty of Medicine at the University of Bologna, which had a tradition of employing very eminent foreign doctors teaching Medicina Sopraordinaria. To this end, the city senate asked the then M.S., Giorgio Scharpes (Medicina Sopraordinaria from 1634 to 1637) write up a report on the Irishman, whose fame by now spanned all of Europe. Scharpes reply was as follows:

"With regard to religion Mr. Glacáin is a Catholic, and there is no doubt because it would be difficult for a heretic to live in a city like Tolosa (Toulouse) which is known to be one of the most Catholic places and where they cannot bear heretics. Mr. Glacáin is about 48. He is famous because during the plague in these regions of France during the years 1627 to 1629 he was very helpful and in the year 1629 he produced a book titled Tractus de Peste ... and I invite you to read this book to understand exactly why Mr. Glacáin is valuable and why he is still teaching in the University of Tolosa ... About his teaching he is well estimated because he is a good philosopher, good in fighting against his enemies that accused him of being a magician; his book can confirm that he was not a magician ... Mr. Glacáin knows Greek very well ... talking about the other questions ... from a letter from Mr. Glacáin where he says he would really like to serve the University of Bologna, I can understand that there will not be any problem for the salary and for him to come."

Ó Glacáin became Professor of Medicina Theorica Soparodinaria at Bologna in 1642, an office he held till his death eleven years later.

During his years in Bologna, Niall Ó Glacáin wrote his Cursus Medicus (Medicine lessons), which appeared in three volumes; the first dealt with physiology, the second pathology, and the third – which appeared after his death – on the theory of signs. This final volume dealt with the different diagnosis by doctors, descriptions of diseases, and was overall an introduction to the modern concept of differential diagnosis.

Two other Irishmen resident in the city, Gregory Fallon of Connacht and the Rev. Phillip Roche, S.J., wrote commendatory verses prefixing volume two.

Personal life

Niall Ó Glacáin's personal life is almost unknown, but he did entertain Bishop of Ferns Nicholas French and Sir Nicholas Plunkett at his home in Bologna, when the latter were on their way to Rome in 1648. In collaboration with them he wrote eulogistic poems in Latin to Innocent X, titled Regni Hiberniae ad Sanctissimi Innocenti Pont. Max. Pyramides Encomiasticae. In his later work he mentions another friend, the Franciscan catechist and grammarian, Fr. Froinsias Ó Maolmhuaidh.

Bibliography

 Tractatus de Peste, Seu Brevis, Facilis et Experta Methodud Curandi Pestem, University of Toulouse Press, 1629.
 Cursus medicus, libris tredecem propositus, three volumes, University of Bologna press, 1655.

References

 Niall O'Glacan, by David Murphy, in Dictionary of Irish Biography ... to the year 2002, ed. James McGuire and James Quinn, Cambridge, 2009.
 Niall O'Glacan (Nellani Glacan), Conall MacCuinneagáin, Donegal Annual, pp. 15–21, 2010.

External links
 

Irish poets
People from County Donegal
Irish expatriates in Spain
Irish expatriates in Italy
Irish expatriates in France
Irish medical writers
16th-century Irish medical doctors
Irish pathologists
Forensic pathologists
Plague doctor
17th-century Irish medical doctors
1560s births
1653 deaths